Samuel Thomas Harper Morrison (born March 26, 1990 in Olongapo, Zambales), also known as Butch Morrison, is a Filipino taekwondo practitioner.

Career

Early career
During his childhood Morrison played recreational basketball. Being an avid viewer of Power Rangers and Masked Rider, these shows influenced Morrison to take up taekwondo and he started to learn the sport in a local taekwondo gym in Olongapo.

Collegiate
Morrison attended the University of Santo Tomas and was part of the Tiger Jins, the university's taekwondo team. He won gold for UST at the UAAP in 2008. By 2011 he was reported to be a student of the Far Eastern University.

International
Morrison has competed at the world championships three times. He was a gold medalist at the 2015 Southeast Asian Games, and a bronze medalist at the  2014 Asian Games. He also won silver at the 2011 Summer Universiade.

Morrison's attempt to qualify for 2012 Summer Olympics by entering the 2011 Asian Taekwondo Olympic Qualification Tournament failed. He attributed his failure to a lack of discipline and composure amidst bad calls, as well as his opponent's tactics. Morrison's attempt to qualify for the 2016 Summer Olympics by competing at the 2016 Asian Taekwondo Olympic Qualification Tournament. also failed, although he was able to reach the Quarter finals.

Personal life
Morrison's father is a retired American Naval serviceman, and currently teaches History in the District of Columbia, and is based in Maryland. Morrison's mother is Filipina.

References

Living people
1990 births
Filipino male taekwondo practitioners
Asian Games medalists in taekwondo
Taekwondo practitioners at the 2010 Asian Games
Taekwondo practitioners at the 2014 Asian Games
Filipino people of American descent
Sportspeople from Olongapo
University of Santo Tomas alumni
Far Eastern University alumni
Asian Games gold medalists for the Philippines
Asian Games bronze medalists for the Philippines
Medalists at the 2014 Asian Games
Universiade medalists in taekwondo
Southeast Asian Games gold medalists for the Philippines
Competitors at the 2019 Southeast Asian Games
Southeast Asian Games medalists in taekwondo
Taekwondo practitioners at the 2018 Asian Games
Competitors at the 2017 Southeast Asian Games
Competitors at the 2015 Southeast Asian Games
Universiade medalists for the Philippines
Medalists at the 2011 Summer Universiade
Southeast Asian Games bronze medalists for the Philippines
Competitors at the 2021 Southeast Asian Games